Tengushevo (Teńgžele; , Teńgžvele) is a rural locality (a selo) and the administrative center of Tengushevsky District of the Republic of Mordovia, Russia. Population:

References

Notes

Sources

Rural localities in Mordovia
Tengushevsky District
Temnikovsky Uyezd